Pyskowice  is a village in the administrative district of Gmina Złotoryja, within Złotoryja County, Lower Silesian Voivodeship, in south-western Poland.

According to linguist Heinrich Adamy, the name of the village comes from the Polish word piasek, which means "sand". Since the Middle Ages, it was part of Piast-ruled Poland. Later on, it was also part of Bohemia (Czechia), Prussia and Germany. Following Germany's defeat in World War II, in 1945, the village became again part of Poland.

References

Pyskowice